Thomas Ball (28 February 1809 – 25 December 1897) was a New Zealand coloniser, landowner and politician. He was born in Brigg, Lincolnshire, England, on 28 February 1809.

He was a 19th-century Member of Parliament from Northland, New Zealand.

He died at Onehunga in 1897, having resided there for 18 years. He was buried at Purewa Cemetery.

References

1809 births
1897 deaths
New Zealand MPs for North Island electorates
English emigrants to New Zealand
People from Brigg
Members of the New Zealand House of Representatives
Burials at Purewa Cemetery
19th-century New Zealand politicians